Dynamo (stylised as dynamo) is Japanese electro-rock band Avengers in Sci-Fi's third studio album, and first under a major record label. It was released on October 13, 2010, as an exclusive download on iTunes simultaneously with their live album Crazy Gonna Spacey, with the album's wide release on the 20th.

Promotion

The album was led by a preceding single, "Delight Slight Lightspeed," in September. It was released as a two track single, along with a seven track DVD, featuring highlights from the band's Crazy Gonna Spacy Tour at Ebisu Liquidroom (April 3, 2010). "Delight Slight Lightspeed" was later chosen as the commercial song for Cedar Crest in October.

In the initial album press release, it was described as "a speed-of-light story of 13 songs, two lives swimming over 1,000 light years interweaving, and spinning truth and love from the universe."

"Wonderpower" was used as the lead track from the album, and received a music video, directed by Takayuki Kojima. The song, along with "Delight Slight Lightspeed" were the album tracks from the album performed at concerts before the album's release.

The band will promote the album with their Delight Slight Flight Tour, a 28 date Japan tour starting on the 13th of November and finishing on February the 19th.

Track listing
All lyrics written by Tarō Kohata, all music written and songs performed by Avengers in Sci-Fi.

Chart rankings

Reported sales

Release history

References

External links
Victor Dynamo profile 

2010 albums
Japanese-language albums
Victor Entertainment albums